Nathan Gertse is a South African footballer who last played as a defender in the National First Division for Cape Umoya United.

References

External links
 Nathan Gertse at Footballdatabase

1991 births
Living people
Association football defenders
Sportspeople from Cape Town
South African soccer players
Cape Town Spurs F.C. players
Vasco da Gama (South Africa) players
Santos F.C. (South Africa) players
Cape Town All Stars players
Ubuntu Cape Town F.C. players
Cape Umoya United F.C. players
South African Premier Division players
National First Division players